A referendum was held in the breakaway republic of Transnistria on 6 April 2003. Voters were asked to support a change in the country's constitution that would allow the private ownership of land. Turnout was 38.92%, falling short of the 50% required by Transnistrian law for the referendum to be valid. Of the participating voters, 56% voted in favour and 44% against.

Results

References

Referendums in Transnistria
Transnistria
2003 elections in Moldova
2003 in Transnistria